Martania is a genus of moths in the family Geometridae first described by Vladimir Mironov in 2000. It is sometimes included in Perizoma.

Selected species
Species include:
 Martania albofasciata (Moore, 1888)
 Martania denigrata Inoue, 2004
 Martania fulvida (Butler, 1881)
 Martania minimata (Staudinger, 1897)
 Martania obscurata (Bastelberger, 1909)
 Martania saxea (Wileman, 1911)
 Martania seriata (Moore, 1888)
 Martania sugii (Inoue, 1998)
 Martania taeniata (Stephens, 1831)
 Martania taiwana (Wileman, 1911)

References
"74.シャクガ科(Geometridae) ナミシャク亜科(Larentiinae) Martania 一覧". Japanese Moths.

Perizomini